Methyl isocyanide or isocyanomethane is an organic compound and a member of the isocyanide family. This colorless liquid is isomeric to methyl cyanide (acetonitrile), but its reactivity is very different. In contrast to the faintly sweet, ethereal odor of acetonitrile, the smell of methyl isocyanide, like that of other simple volatile isocyanides, is distinctly penetrating and vile. Methyl isocyanide is mainly used for making 5-membered heterocyclic rings.  The C-N distance in methyl isocyanide is very short, 1.158 Å as is characteristic of isocyanides.

Preparation and uses
Methyl isocyanide was first prepared by A. Gautier by reaction of silver cyanide with methyl iodide. The common method for preparing methyl isocyanides is the dehydration of N-methylformamide.  Many metal cyanides react with methylating agents to give complexes of methyl isocyanide.  This kind of reactivity has been invoked as being relevant to the origin of life.

Methyl isocyanide is useful for the preparation of diverse heterocycles.  It is often used to prepare transition metal isocyanide complexes.

Safety 
Methyl isocyanide is very endothermic (ΔfH⦵(g) = +150.2 kJ/mol, 3.66 kJ/g) and can isomerize explosively to acetonitrile. A sample exploded when heated in a sealed ampoule, and during redistillation at 59 °C/1 bar, a drop of liquid fell back into the dry boiler flask and exploded violently. The explosive decomposition of methyl isocyanide has been studied in detail.

References

External links
 

Hazardous air pollutants
Isocyanides
Ligands
Foul-smelling chemicals